Ravisrinivasan Sai Kishore (born 6 November 1996) is an Indian cricketer who plays for Tamil Nadu.

Career
He made his List A debut for Tamil Nadu in the 2016–17 Vijay Hazare Trophy on 12 March 2017. He made his first-class debut for Tamil Nadu in the 2017–18 Ranji Trophy on 14 October 2017. He made his Twenty20 debut for Tamil Nadu in the 2017–18 Zonal T20 League on 8 January 2018.

He was the leading wicket-taker for Tamil Nadu in the 2018–19 Ranji Trophy, with 22 dismissals in six matches. In the 2020 IPL auction, he was bought by the Chennai Super Kings ahead of the 2020 Indian Premier League.

In June 2021, he was named as one of five net bowlers for India's tour of Sri Lanka. Following a positive case for COVID-19 in the Indian team, Kishore was added to India's main squad for their final two Twenty20 International (T20I) matches of the tour.

In January 2022, he was named as one of two standby players in India's T20I squad for their home series against the West Indies. The following month, he was bought by the Gujarat Titans in the 2022 Indian Premier League (IPL) auction.

Honours

 Indian Premier League champion 2022

References

External links
 

1996 births
Living people
Indian cricketers
Tamil Nadu cricketers
Gujarat Titans cricketers
Place of birth missing (living people)